Roman Kislyakov (born 2 May 1988) is a former Ukrainian professional footballer.

External links

1988 births
Living people
Ukrainian footballers
Association football defenders
Ukrainian expatriate footballers
Expatriate footballers in Belarus
Expatriate footballers in Lithuania
FC Zirka Kropyvnytskyi players
FC Kryvbas Kryvyi Rih players
FC Dnepr Mogilev players
FC Stal Kamianske players